Neoma corrosa is a species of beetle in the family Cerambycidae, the only species in the genus Neoma.

References

Prioninae